Illah is a town in Delta State, Nigeria on the west bank of the River Niger.

Illah may also refer to:

 Al-Mu’id li-Din Illah (died 1030), Yemeni imam
 Illah, Khuzestan, Iran

See also

 Allah (disambiguation)
 Ilah
 Illa (disambiguation)
 Illahe